Miracles: The Holiday Album is the first holiday album and seventh studio album by saxophonist Kenny G. It was released by Arista Records on November 22, 1994, and peaked at number 1 on the Billboard 200, Contemporary Jazz Albums and Hot R&B/Hip-Hop Albums charts.  It was the overall best-selling Christmas/holiday album in the United States for both 1994 and 1996. It sold 2,987,000 copies in 1994 and 888,000 copies in 1996.

According to Billboard magazine, Miracles: The Holiday Album is the best-selling Christmas/holiday album of the Nielsen SoundScan era of music sales tracking (March 1991 – present). As of November 2014, the album has sold a total of 7,310,000 copies in the U.S. according to SoundScan.

Miracles: The Holiday Album was certified eight-times Platinum by the Recording Industry Association of America for shipment of eight million copies in the United States.

Track listing (non-US edition) 
 "Winter Wonderland" (Felix Bernard/Dick Smith) – 3:03
 "White Christmas" (Irving Berlin) – 3:02
 "Have Yourself a Merry Little Christmas" (Hugh Martin/Ralph Blane) – 3:58
 "The Christmas Song" (Mel Tormé/Robert Wells) – 4:03
 "Silent Night" (Franz Xaver Gruber, Joseph Mohr) – 3:47
 "Brahms's Lullaby" (Johannes Brahms) – 3:15
 "Greensleeves (What Child Is This?) (Traditional)" – 3:29
 "Miracles" (Kenny G/Walter Afanasieff) – 2:32
 "Away in a Manger" (James R. Murray) – 2:39
 "The Chanukah Song" (Kenny G/Walter Afanasieff) – 2:31
 "Little Drummer Boy" (Katherine K. Davis/Henry Onerati/Harry Simeone) – 4:05
 "Silver Bells" (Jay Livingston/Ray Evans) - 4:00
 "Spring Breeze" (Ling-Chiu Lee/Yu-Shian Deng) - 3:20

Track listing (US edition) 
 "Winter Wonderland" – 3:03
 "White Christmas" – 3:02
 "Have Yourself a Merry Little Christmas" – 3:58
 "Silent Night" – 3:47
 "Greensleeves" – 3:29
 "Miracles" – 2:32
 "Little Drummer Boy" – 4:05
 "The Chanukah Song" – 2:31
 "Silver Bells" - 4:00
 "Away in a Manger" – 2:39
 "Brahms's Lullaby" – 3:15

Personnel 
 Kenny G – arrangements, soprano saxophone (1, 2, 4-6, 8-11, 13), tenor saxophone (3, 12), alto saxophone (7)
 Walter Afanasieff – arrangements (1, 3-13), all other instruments (1, 3, 5, 9, 11, 13), acoustic piano (2, 4, 6, 8, 10), keyboards (7), bass (7), drums (7), organ (12)
 Gary Cirimelli – digital programming, Synclavier programming
 Randy Waldman – acoustic piano (12)
 Dann Huff – guitar (12)
 Randy Jackson – bass (12)
 John Robinson – drums (12)
 Robert Damper – arrangements (2)
 William Ross – string arrangements and conductor (2, 3, 4, 6, 8, 9, 10)

Production 
 Producer – Kenny G
 Engineers – Steve Sheppard (tracks 1, 2, 3, 6, 8, 9 & 10); David Gleeson (tracks 4, 5 & 11); Dana Jon Chappelle (tracks 7, 12 & 13).
 Assistant Engineer on track 12 – Noel Hazel
 Mixed by Mick Guzauski (tracks 1-12) and Steve Sheppard (track 13).
 Recorded and Mixed at Studio G (Seattle, WA).
 Strings on tracks 2, 3, 4, 6, 8, 9 & 10 recorded at Humberto Gatica at Ocean Way Recording (Hollywood, CA).
 Mastered by Bernie Grundman at Bernie Grundman Mastering (Hollywood, CA).
 Art Direction and Design – Christopher Stern
 Photography – Timothy White

Chart positions

Singles 
Information taken from this source.

Certifications and Sales

See also
 List of number-one albums of 1994 (U.S.)
 List of number-one albums of 1995 (U.S.)
 List of number-one R&B albums of 1994 (U.S.)
 List of number-one R&B albums of 1995 (U.S.)

References 

Kenny G albums
1994 Christmas albums
Christmas albums by American artists
Jazz Christmas albums
Arista Records Christmas albums